True lemurs, also known as brown lemurs, are the lemurs in genus Eulemur. They are medium-sized primates that live exclusively on Madagascar.

The fur of the true lemurs is long and usually reddish brown. Often, sexual dimorphism in coloration (sexual dichromatism) is seen, such as in the black lemur.

True lemurs are predominantly diurnal forest inhabitants, with some species preferring rain forests, while others live in dry forests. They are skillful climbers and can cross large distances in trees by jumping, using their nonprehensile tails to aid in balancing. When on the ground, they move almost exclusively on all four legs. True lemurs are social animals and live together in groups of two to 15 members.

The diet of the true lemurs is almost exclusively herbivorous – flowers, fruits and leaves. In captivity, they have been shown to also eat insects.

Gestation is 125 days. During the summer or early fall (shortly before the beginning of the rainy season), the females birth their young, usually two offspring. The young clasp firmly to the fur of their mother, then ride on her back when they are older. After about five months, they are weaned, and they are fully mature around 18 months of age. The life expectancy of the true lemurs can be up to 18 years, but this can be longer in captivity.

Classification 
 Genus Eulemur
 Common brown lemur, E. fulvus
 Sanford's brown lemur, E. sanfordi
 White-headed lemur, E. albifrons
 Red lemur, E. rufus
 Red-fronted lemur, E. rufifrons
 Collared brown lemur, E. collaris
 Gray-headed lemur, E. cinereiceps
 Black lemur, E. macaco
 Blue-eyed black lemur, E. flavifrons
 Crowned lemur, E. coronatus
 Red-bellied lemur, E. rubriventer
 Mongoose lemur, E. mongoz

Survival 
Brown lemurs are able to survive degraded forest that would cut off their food supply through expanding their range throughout the terrain.

References

External links

ARKive - images and movies of the collared brown lemur (Eulemur collaris)
 Primate Info Net Eulemur Factsheets

Further reading